1922 is a year.

1922 may also refer to:

Arts, entertainment, and media
1922 (1978 film), a Greek drama film directed by Nikos Koundouros
1922 (novella), a 2010 novella by Stephen King
1922 (2017 film), an American horror film based on King's novella

Weapons
 FN Model 1922, a pistol
 Fyodorov–Shpagin Model 1922, a machine gun
 Springfield Model 1922, a bolt-action rifle

Other uses
1922 Committee, the parliamentary group of the Conservative Party in the UK House of Commons
Submarine 1922, a submarine volcano